Daniel Elliott is an American politician from Indiana. A member of the Republican Party, Elliott is the current Indiana State Treasurer.

Early life and career
Elliott grew up in rural Jennings County, Indiana and now lives in Morgan County. Elliott started his own software development business based in Martinsville, Indiana. Elliott graduated from Utah Valley University with a bachelor's degree in business and computer science.

Elliott ran for the Indiana House of Representatives in the 2012 elections, losing in the Republican Party primary election to Peggy Mayfield. In 2013, he was elected chair of the Morgan County Republican Party. In 2016 Daniel was elected as a member of the Morgan County Council. Elliott has served for many years as President of the Morgan County Redevelopment Commission and as a member of the Morgan County Economic Development Corporation. In 2018, he led the successful movement to "endorse marriage between a man and a woman as the ideal basis for strong families" in the Indiana Republican Party platform.

Indiana State Treasurer
In May 2021, Elliott announced his candidacy for Indiana State Treasurer in the 2022 election, as the incumbent, Kelly Mitchell could not run for a third term due to term limits. He won the nomination at the Republican Party convention. Elliott defeated Jessica McClellan, the county treasurer for Monroe County and the Democratic Party nominee, in the November 8 general election. Elliott is the first Latter-day Saint to hold state-wide elected office in Indiana.

Personal life
Elliott lives in Green Township, a rural area of Morgan County, Indiana with his wife, Laura, and their 4 children. Daniel is a member of the Church of Jesus Christ of Latter-day Saints and served for two years as a missionary in Argentina.

References

External links

|-

 

Indiana Republicans
Living people
People from Morgan County, Indiana
State treasurers of Indiana
Utah Valley University alumni
Year of birth missing (living people)